Quicksilver is a 1986 American drama film written and directed by Thomas Michael Donnelly and starring Kevin Bacon. The film, which was distributed by Columbia Pictures, also stars Jami Gertz, Paul Rodriguez, Louie Anderson, Laurence Fishburne, and Rudy Ramos.

Plot

Jack Casey (Kevin Bacon) is a young floor trader on the Pacific Exchange who loses all of his company's and family's savings on a risky trade. Deflated and disenchanted with his profession, he quits his job and becomes a bicycle messenger. Casey has to deal with his parents and his girlfriend, who are disappointed with his new job. Along with the colorful characters that work with him, he saves a troubled young woman named Terri (Jami Gertz) from a gang.

Although frustrated, Casey enjoys the freedom that comes with his lower responsibility. He also uses his education and business acumen to help his co-workers. When some of them are involved in dangerous or difficult matters, Casey must decide whether he should become involved. Those matters lead to a sinister web of murder and intrigue.

In the final section of the film, Casey returns to the floor of the exchange for a day, buying shares of a plummeting penny stock and holding on until it recovers. He thus restores his family's fortune and enables his bike-messenger friend, Hector (Paul Rodriguez), to afford the hot dog stand he has dreamed of. Terri is again menaced by drug dealer Gypsy but is rescued by Casey's fellow bike messengers. In retaliation against Gypsy, Casey engages in an extended car-versus-bike confrontation that ends with Gypsy driving off the end of an uncompleted highway. The film flashes forward to Casey applying for 'normal' jobs and Terri deciding to become a paramedic, and the pair buying hot dogs from Hector.

Cast
 Kevin Bacon as Jack Casey
 Jami Gertz as Terri
 Paul Rodriguez as Hector Rodriguez
 Rudy Ramos as 'Gypsy'
 Andrew Smith as Gabe Kaplan
 Gerald S. O'Loughlin as Mr. Casey
 Larry Fishburne as 'Voodoo' 
 Louie Anderson as 'Tiny'
 Charles McCaughan as 'Airborne'
 David Harris as 'Apache'
 Whitney Kershaw as Rand
 Joshua Shelley as 'Shorty'
 Georgann Johnson as Mrs. Casey

Music
The film's theme song is "Quicksilver Lightning" by Giorgio Moroder and Dean Pitchford. Performed by Roger Daltrey, it was a minor hit on the pop charts. The film score was composed by Tony Banks, of Genesis fame. Other music is contributed by performers such as Ray Parker Jr. and Peter Frampton. "The Motown Song" would later be covered by Rod Stewart with The Temptations in 1991 and would become a hit on the pop charts.

Soundtrack 
 "Quicksilver Lightning" – Roger Daltrey
 "Casual Thing" – Fiona
 "Nothing At All" – Peter Frampton
 "Shortcut to Somewhere" – Fish and Tony Banks
 "Through the Night (Love Song from Quicksilver)" – John Parr and Marilyn Martin
 "One Sunny Day/Dueling Bikes from Quicksilver" – Ray Parker Jr. and Helen Terry
 "The Motown Song" – Larry John McNally
 "Suite Streets-From Quicksilver" - Thomas Newman
 "Quicksilver Suite I/Rebirth/The Gypsy" – Tony Banks
 "Quicksilver Suite II/Crash Landing" – Tony Banks

Home media

The DVD for Quicksilver was released on December 10, 2002 by Sony Pictures Home Entertainment.

Reception 

The film received negative reviews and as of January 2021 has only a 13% rating on Rotten Tomatoes based on 16 reviews.

In The New York Times, Walter Goodman wrote "As long as the characters are doing stunts or whizzing impossibly through city traffic to a strong rock beat, there's something to watch. For the rest of the time, Quicksilver is as much fun as a slow leak."

Bacon's views on the film
In 2008, Kevin Bacon called the film "the absolute lowest point of my career."

References

External links
 

1986 films
1986 drama films
American drama films
Cycling films
Films set in New York City
Films set in San Francisco
Films shot in San Francisco
Trading films
Columbia Pictures films
1986 directorial debut films
1980s English-language films
1980s American films